HMS Mediator was a 10-gun single-masted sloop of war of the Royal Navy, in service in American in 1745, during the War of the Austrian Succession. Built in Chesapeake Bay in 1742, she was purchased by the Navy four years later and sailed to Portsmouth for fitting out by Peirson Lock.

She was captured by a French privateer in June 1745, but recaptured the following day.

Mediator sprang a leak and foundered in Ostend harbor on 29 July 1745.

Construction
Mediator was built as a private merchant vessel in early 1742, on the shore of Chesapeake Bay in the British colony of Virginia. She was a single-masted sloop with sloop-rigged sails, a  keel and a substantial  beam.

References

Bibliography
 

Sloops of the Royal Navy
1741 ships
Maritime incidents in 1745